Lockett is a surname that may refer to:

People
 Aaron Lockett, English footballer
 Charles Lockett, American football wide receiver
 Clayton Lockett, American criminal
 Colin Lockett, American football wide receiver
 Dannie Lockett, American football linebacker
 Gary Lockett, Welsh boxer
 Harry Lockett, early English football manager and administrator
 Jack Lockett, oldest Australian World War I veteran
 James R. Lockett, U.S. colonel
 John W. Lockett, American football fullback from University of Central Oklahoma
 Johnny Lockett, British Grand Prix motorcyclist
 Ken Lockett, Canadian ice hockey goalkeeper
 Kevin Lockett, American football wide receiver
 Lester Lockett, American Negro league baseball player
 Mornington Lockett, English jazz saxophonist
 Nicky Lockett (born 28 March 1970), or Lockett, other names of MC Tunes, British rapper
 Pete Lockett, English percussionist and recording artist
 Sarah Lockett, TV news anchor and reporter
 Tony Lockett, Australian rules football player, leading VFL/AFL goalkicker
 Tyler C. Lockett, American jurist
 Tyler Lockett, American football wide receiver for the Seattle Seahawks
 Vivian Lockett, English colonel in the British army, and a 10 goal handicap player

Fictional characters
The Lockett family, subject of a 1936-1950 series of children's novels by M.E. Atkinson

Corporal Jason Lockett, character in the 2011 film Battle Los Angeles

Places
 Camp Lockett, United States Army base in Campo, California (named after James R. Lockett)
 Lockett, Texas, United States